The Perishers is a cartoon series produced by Bill Melendez Productions and FilmFair. BBC1 transmitted it in 1979 and repeated until 1988. The series is based on Maurice Dodd's long-running comic strip, The Perishers.

Sheila Steafel voiced the roles of Maisie and Baby Grumpling; Leonard Rossiter voiced Boot; Judy Bennett voiced Wellington; Peter Hawkins served as the narrator, and voiced the characters of Marlon and BH.

Castle Vision published the first home video release of The Perishers: Two VHS videocassettes, each with 10 episodes. Abbey Home Media republished the first 10 episodes to a Region 2 DVD titled The Perishers: Magic Mirror (27 February 2006), and the remaining 10 episodes to a second DVD, The Perishers: The Skateboard Champion (12 March 2007).

Episode

References

External links
 The Perishers, a fan page with character descriptions, an episode guide, and production information
 
 
 The Perishers at Toonarific
 The Perishers at the BFI Film & TV Database
 The Perishers at Jedi's Paradise

1979 British television series debuts
1979 British television series endings
1970s British children's television series
British children's animated adventure television series
English-language television shows
Television series by FilmFair
Television series by Cookie Jar Entertainment
1970s British animated television series